Barbourville is the name of several places in the United States of America:

 Barbourville, Kentucky
 Barbourville Commercial District, historic district in Kentucky
 Barbourville, New York, a hamlet

See also

 Barboursville (disambiguation)